This is a list of the seals of the provinces of Thailand.

Current provinces
This list includes all the seals of the provinces of Thailand. It also includes the special administrative area of the capital, Bangkok.

Former provinces

See also
List of Thai provincial trees

References

External links

 "ประกาศสำนักนายกรัฐมนตรี เรื่อง กำหนดภาพเครื่องหมายราชการ ตามพระราชบัญญัติเครื่องหมายราชการ พุทธศักราช 2482

X
Thailand